Sattanna (Telugu:సత్తన్న) Satish Kumar is a Telugu humorist anchor and comedian. He has acted in more than 95 (as of 20 August 2019) films as a character artist. He is best known as Nizam Babu and hosts TV news and entertainment shows. He is presently doing a program in ETV plus called FUNDAY.

Partial filmography
Housefull
Samanyudu (2006) as Politician 
Ullasamga Utsahamga (2008) as Software Engineer

TV shows
MAA TV Just For Fun run for 2 years 8 months
Maa TV Mee Inti Vanta 1900 Edition
Interview With Upendra Mr Valentine Gemini TV
Tollywood channel daily at 9.30 am to 10am 
Dooradarshan every Saturday 3.30 to 4pm

References

Indian male comedians
Telugu male actors
Telugu stand-up comedians
Living people
Year of birth missing (living people)